MoonJune Records is a record label specializing in progressive rock, jazz rock, and avant-garde music. It was founded by record producer Leonardo Pavkovic in 2001.

History
Pavkovic was born in Yugoslavia and grew up in southern Italy. In his youth he was attracted to the music of Black Sabbath, Deep Purple, the Doors, and Led Zeppelin, then the progressive rock of Genesis, Pink Floyd, and Yes, followed by the blues of John Lee Hooker, Muddy Waters, and John Mayall. He cites as additional influences the concert documentaries Woodstock (1970), The Isle of Wight (1970), and Pink Floyd: Live at Pompeii (1972). He avoids any music that could be considered mainstream.

During the 1980s, he discovered ECM Records and from its roster of musicians Keith Jarrett, Jan Garbarek, Egberto Gismonti, Pat Metheny, Terje Rypdal, and Eberhard Weber. He also admired the music of John Coltrane, Miles Davis, Sun Ra, and Keith Tippett.

In college he concentrated on Brazilian and Portuguese literature. He speaks six languages: Serbian, Croatian, Italian, Spanish, Portuguese, and English. In 1990 he moved to New York City and worked in graphic design. A fan of progressive rock, he attended NEARfest in 2000 and saw the band DFA from Verona, Italy. With his friend Elton Dean, he released DFA's album Work in Progress Live and two other albums, Bar Torque by Elton Dean and Mark Hewins, and Storybook by Finisterre, which became the first releases by MoonJune.

MoonJune has released albums by Gilad Atzmon, Dewa Budjana, D.F.A., Dwiki Dharmawan, Michel Delville, Yumi Hara, Tony Levin, Marbin, Phil Miller, Dennis Rea, Markus Reuter, Asaf Sirkis, Soft Machine, Stick Men, Tohpati, TriPod, and Mark Wingfield. In February 2020, MoonJune Records released its 100th album.

References

External links
 Official website
 Bandcamp page

Blues record labels
Jazz record labels
Rock record labels
Record labels established in 2001